Bátmonostor is a  village in Bács-Kiskun county, in the Southern Great Plain region of southern Hungary.

Geography

Demography
Residents are Magyars. There is a small community of Croats in the village.

References

Populated places in Bács-Kiskun County